Marci Shore (born 1972) is an American associate professor of intellectual history at Yale University, where she specializes in the history of literary and political engagement with Marxism and phenomenology. 

Shore is the author of Caviar and Ashes: A Warsaw Generation's Life and Death in Marxism, 1918–1968, a milieu biography of Polish and Polish-Jewish writers drawn to Marxism in the twentieth century; and of The Taste of Ashes, a study of the presence of the communist and Nazi past in today's Eastern Europe. She translated Michał Głowiński's Holocaust memoir, The Black Seasons. Shore married Timothy D. Snyder, professor of history at Yale, in 2005. Shore is Jewish.

Education
Shore graduated in 1991 from William Allen High School in Allentown, Pennsylvania.  She received her B.A. from Stanford University in 1994, her M.A. from the University of Toronto in 1996, and her doctorate from Stanford University in 2001.  She works chiefly in  French,  German,  Polish,  Russian,  Czech,  Slovak,  Ukrainian, and Yiddish sources.  She was also a postdoctoral fellow at the Harriman Institute, an assistant professor of history and Jewish studies at Indiana University, and the Jacob and Hilda Blaustein Visiting Assistant Professor of Judaic Studies at Yale.  She has twice been a fellow of the Institut für die Wissenschaften vom Menschen (Institute of Human Sciences) in Vienna. Shore teaches  European  cultural and  intellectual history at Yale.

Awards
Her book, Caviar and Ashes: A Warsaw Generation's Life and Death in Marxism, 1918-1968, won eight awards and was shortlisted for several more.  These include:
 Winner, 2006 National Jewish Book Award in Eastern European Studies given by the Jewish Book Council.
 Winner, 2007 Oskar Halecki Polish/East Central European History Award given by the Polish Institute of Arts and Sciences of America.
 Co-winner, 2007 American Association for the Advancement of Slavic Studies/Orbis Books Prize for Polish Studies.
 Finalist for the Koret International Jewish Book Award in Jewish Thought.

Publications

Books
 The Ukrainian Night: An Intimate History of Revolution (Yale University Press, 2017)
 The Taste of Ashes (Crown Books/Random House, 2013, UK edition: Heinemann, German edition: Beck, Polish edition: Świat Ksiazki)
 Caviar and Ashes: A Warsaw Generation's Life and Death in Marxism, 1918–1968 (Yale University Press, 2006, Polish edition: Świat Ksiazki, 2008)
 Translator, Michał Głowiński's The Black Seasons (Northwestern University Press, 2005)

Articles
 "Czysto Babski: A Women's Friendship in a Man's Revolution." East European Politics and Societies, Aug. 1, 2002
 "Engineering in the Age of Innocence: A Genealogy of Discourse Inside the Czechoslovak Writer's Union, 1949–1967." East European Politics and Societies, September 1998, Vol. 12 Issue 3
 "Children of the Revolution: Communism, Zionism, and the Berman Brothers", Jewish Social Studies. Spring 2004, Vol. 10 Issue 3
 "Conversing with Ghosts: Jedwabne, Zydokomuna, and Totalitarianism", Kritika: Explorations of Russian and Eurasian History, June 2005, Vol. 6 Issue 2
 "Tevye's Daughters: Jews and European Modernity", Contemporary European History. February 2007, Vol. 16 Issue 1
 "When God Died: Symptoms of the East European Avant-Garde—and of Slavoj Zizek." Slovo a smysl/Word and Sense: A Journal of Interdisciplinary Theory and Criticism in Czech Studies, 2005
 "Man liess sie nicht mal ein paar Worte sagen." Frankfurter Allgemeine Zeitung, December 2001
 "Za dużo kompromisów. Stop." Gazeta Wyborcza (Warsaw), July 11, 2009
  “(The End of) Communism as a Generational History: Some Thoughts on Czechoslovakia and Poland.” Contemporary European History 18, no. 3 (2009)
 "A Pre-History of Post-Truth, East and West." Eurozine and Public Seminar Sept. 1 2017
 "On the Uses and Disadvantages of Historical Comparisons for Life." Public Seminar Oct. 19, 2020

References

External links
 Yale History faculty page

Living people
1972 births
20th-century American Jews
21st-century American historians
Educators from Allentown, Pennsylvania
Writers from Allentown, Pennsylvania
Yale University faculty
Stanford University alumni
University of Toronto alumni
William Allen High School alumni
American women historians
Historians from Pennsylvania
Historians of communism
21st-century American women writers
21st-century American Jews